This is a list of notable individuals born in Mexico of Lebanese ancestry or people of Lebanese and Mexican dual nationality who live or lived in Mexico.

Arts and entertainment
Actors
Dario Yazbek Bernal - actor, best known for his role as 'Julián de la Mora' in Netflix's The House of Flowers.
 Bichir family
Alejandro Bichir - actor
Bruno Bichir - actor
Demián Bichir - Academy Award-nominated actor
Odiseo Bichir - actor
 Capulina - actor
 Edy Ganem - actress, starred in Devious Maids
 Mauricio Garcés - actor
 Astrid Hadad - actress
 Salma Hayek - Academy Award-nominated actress
 Emile Kuri - set decorator and two-time Academy Award winner 
 Bárbara de Regil - actress 
 Emeraude Toubia - actress
Music
 Susana Harp - singer
 Carlos Jiménez Mabarak - musician
Visual arts
Charlotte Yazbek - sculptor
Writers
 Jaime Sabines - poet
Sports
José Abella - professional footballer
Jerónimo Amione - professional footballer
Salim Chartouni - former footballer, current sports tv analyst.
Taufic Guarch - professional footballer
Emilio Hassan - professional footballer
Gibran Lajud - professional footballer
Miguel Layún - professional footballer
Samer Omar - professional footballer
Miguel Sabah - professional footballer

Business
 Pépé Abed - businessman
 Arturo Elias Ayub - businessman 
 Alfredo Harp Helú - businessman; cousin of Carlos Slim Helú
 Kamel Nacif Borge - businessman
 Carlos Slim Domit - businessman; son of Carlos Slim Helú
 Carlos Slim Helú - businessman; at or near the top of lists of the world's wealthiest people since 2005
 Jean Succar Kuri - businessman

Politics
 Alfredo Elías Ayub - General Director of the Comisión Federal de Electricidad
 Jorge Estefan Chidiac - politician
 María de Lourdes Dieck-Assad - economist of Belgian and Levantine descent
 Omar Fayad - politician
 Humberto Hernandez-Haddad, Mexican lawyer, former Federal Senator and Congressman
 Jesús Murillo Karam - politician
 José Antonio Meade Kuribreña - politician
 Ricardo Dájer Nahum - politician
 Alfonso Petersen - mayor of Guadalajara
 Daniel Karam Toumeh - director of the Mexican Social Security Institute (Instituto Mexicano del Seguro Social, IMSS)
 Miguel Ángel Yunes - politician and lawyer of Lebanese ancestry
 José Yunes Zorrilla - politician of Lebanese ancestry

Sports
José Abella - soccer player
Jerónimo Amione - soccer player
Raúl Chabrand - soccer coach
Bruce El-mesmari - soccer player
Taufic Guarch - soccer player
Emilio Hassan - soccer player
Miguel Layún - soccer player
Daniel Lajud - soccer player
Gibrán Lajud - soccer player
Miguel Sabah - soccer player
José Sulaimán - President of the World Boxing Council
Mauricio Sulaimán - President of the World Boxing Council

See also
Arab Mexican
Lebanon–Mexico relations
List of Lebanese people
List of Lebanese people (Diaspora)

References

Mexico
Lebanese
 
Lebanese